Hypatopa hora is a moth in the family Blastobasidae. It is found in Costa Rica.

The length of the forewings is 5–7.1 mm. The forewings are pale brown intermixed with brown and dark-brown scales. The hindwings are translucent pale brown.

Etymology
The specific name is derived from Latin hora (meaning an hour).

References

Moths described in 2013
Hypatopa